The following is the results of the Iranian Volleyball Super League 2010/11 season.

Regular season

Pool A

Pool B

Playoffs

Relegation round

Classification 9th–12th

Top 8

Quarterfinals
Saipa vs. HV Urmia

Kalleh vs. Damash

Paykan vs. HV Kerman

Barij Essence vs. Aboumoslem

Semifinals
Saipa vs. Kalleh

Paykan vs. Barij Essence

3rd place
Kalleh vs. Barij Essence

Final
Saipa vs. Paykan

Final standings

References
Results – Regular season
Results – Playoffs

External links
Iran Volleyball Federation

League 2010-11
Iran Super League, 2010-11
Iran Super League, 2010-11
Volleyball League, 2010-11
Volleyball League, 2010-11